Chistian Tehsil is a tehsil located in  Bahawalnagar District, Punjab, Pakistan. The city of Chishtian is the headquarters of the tehsil which is administratively subdivided into 29 Union Councils.

Geography
Chishtian Tehsil has an area of 1,500 km2.

Adjacent tehsils
Burewala Tehsil, Vehari District (north)
Bahawalnagar Tehsil (northeast)
Haroonabad Tehsil (southeast)
Yazman Tehsil, Bahawalpur District (south)
Hasilpur Tehsil, Bahawalpur District (west)
Vehari Tehsil, Vehari District (northwest)

Demographics

According to the 2017 Census of Pakistan there were 691,221 people living in Chishtian Tehsil and its population in 1998 was 498,270.

Governance

In June 2016, Tehsil Municipal Administration Chishtian employees staged a sit-in due to two months of non-payment.

References

Bahawalnagar District
Tehsils of Punjab, Pakistan
Populated places in Bahawalpur District
Chishti Order